PRA Group, Inc. is a publicly traded global debt buyer based in Norfolk, Virginia. PRA Group was listed in the Federal Trade Commission's 2013 Report on the Debt Buying Industry as one of the top five debt buyers in the US. According to SEC filings, PRA's revenue for 2017 was $813 million.

History
PRA Group began as Portfolio Recovery Associates, LLC in March 1996 by co-founders Kevin Stevenson and Steve Fredrickson. Fredrickson is now the executive chairman of the board of directors. Stevenson is currently CEO and President.  They started with four people out of a small office in Norfolk, Virginia. The company's debt purchasing activities began a few months after the company was formed, in May 1996. The company's name was later changed to Portfolio Recovery Associates, Inc.  Then in October 2014, the name was changed to PRA Group, Inc.  The PRA Group name and the design of its corporate logo were trademarked in 2014.

In 2000, the company reported that it had purchased USD$1 billion of debt during the year, ranking in 10th place among top debt buyers.  By 2010, the company was noted as "the sixth-largest debt buyer in the U.S."

PRA Group's initial public offering was in 2002 and was backed by William Blair & Company and Piper Jaffray. The company is listed on the NASDAQ exchange and traded under the symbol PRAA.

PRA's SEC filings for 2015 state that PRA has large international operations, due to its acquisitions of Aktiv Kapital, a Norway-based debt buyer and lender in Europe and Canada. In 2020, PRA Group expanded into Australia.

For the past 26 years, PRA Group has been a Better Business Bureau accredited company.

Litigation
In 2014, the Attorney General of New York obtained a settlement against PRA "for repeatedly bringing improper debt collection actions against New York consumers." The case involved "uncontested default judgments" levied against defendants who failed to respond to suits brought by PRA against them. In September, 2015, the Consumer Financial Protection Bureau, the regulator of the debt buying industry, made public a Consent Order against PRA, which was detailed in PRA's 2015 Annual Report to the SEC. As part of the Consent Order, PRA received a substantial fine and penalty, and must make restitution to some of its customers due to a variety of questionable debt collection practices.

Adverse regulatory actions 

In September 2015, The Consumer Financial Protection Bureau (CFPB) ordered a subsidiary to pay $19 million in consumer refunds and an $8 million penalty, and stop collecting on over $3 million worth of debts. The CFPB found that the subsidiary:
Threatened and deceived consumers to collect on debts they should have known were inaccurate or had other problems.
Stated incorrect balances, interest rates, and payment due dates in attempting to collect debts from consumers.
Failed to provide documentation on debts.
Filed court cases they knew they had no documentation for in hopes a consumer would default on their court date giving portfolio a default judgement.
Portfolio filed cases on debts that they knew were outside the statute of limitations.
Threatened that they were going to sue when an attorney had not even reviewed the case and made misrepresentations among other things.

PRA's SEC filings for the calendar year 2015, page 92 and elsewhere, detail that the Internal Revenue Service conducted an audit of PRA of tax years 2005 to 2012.  The IRS began litigation against PRA over a tax claim of at least $197 million in 2016. PRA Group settled with the IRS in 2017 over its Notices of Deficiency and PRA Group suffered no penalties or fines for late payment, with the IRS allowing repayment of the unpaid tax over four years without interest of the unpaid amount. PRA Group changed its tax calculation approach and no longer used the cost recovery accounting method for accounts thereafter in order to comply with the IRS settlement.

A 2019 court case between PRA Group's UK subsidiary and a debtor – Doyle vs PRA Group (UK) Ltd – clarified UK law around statute-barred debt, with the judge ruling that creditors were unable to pursue a debt if no action had been taken within six years of the initial default.

Business model
PRA purchases charged off consumer debt from banks and other creditors, returning some of the value of the amount owed to lenders. The company then tries to recover some of the debt.

The company applies predictive computational models when considering acquisition of a debt portfolio to help assess the potential return on investment, as well as on its existing portfolio to conduct ongoing review of its collection strategy.

Operations
The company's headquarters are located in Norfolk, Virginia.

In 2000, the company established a call center in Hutchinson, Kansas.  By late 2001, this facility employed 75.

In 2001, the main facility of the company was in the Riverside Commerce Center in Virginia Beach, Virginia, which employed 380 "collectors/supervisors".

The overall employment figure for 2002 was 590, across all sites and divisions.

Also by 2002, about 50% of the company's debt portfolio (the spectrum of debts purchased) had come from major credit card issuers Visa, MasterCard and Discover.

As shown in its 2015 SEC filings, for the year ending December 31, 2015, PRA had revenues of $942 million, and $880 million in 2014.

PRA Group formalized its Diversity, Equity and Inclusion strategy in 2020, appointing a Director of Diversity and Inclusion, and forming a Diversity and Inclusion Steering Committee (DISC), composed of a diverse slate of employees from various locations and business units.

Subsidiaries
PRA Group's subsidiaries include Portfolio Recovery Associates, LLC, which purchases and collects debt; PRA Receivables Management, LLC, which acquires and services bankrupt and insolvent accounts; PRA Location Services, which helps auto lenders and insurance companies recover missing collateral; and Claims Compensation Bureau (CCB), which monitors and files class action claims on behalf of institutional investors and corporate clients.

Controlling interests
In April 2010, PRA secured a controlling interest in the company Claims Compensation Bureau, which specialized in "recovering funds and processing payments owed under class-action settlements".

References

Collection agencies
Financial services companies of the United States
Financial services companies established in 1996
1996 establishments in Virginia
Debt collection
Debt buyers